is a railway station on the Minobu Line of Central Japan Railway Company (JR Central) located in the town of Minobu, Minamikoma District, Yamanashi Prefecture, Japan.

Lines
Shionosawa Station is served by the Minobu Line and is located 45.7 kilometers from the southern terminus of the line at Fuji Station.

Layout
Shionosawa Station has one side platform serving a single bi-directional track. There is no station building, but only a shelter on the platform. The station is unattended.

Adjacent stations

History
Shinosawa Station was opened on September 1, 1933 as a signal stop on the original Fuji-Minobu Line. It was upgraded to a full station on June 1, 1934. The line came under control of the Japanese Government Railways on May 1, 1941. The JGR became the JNR (Japan National Railway) after World War II.  Along with the division and privatization of JNR on April 1, 1987, the station came under the control and operation of the Central Japan Railway Company.

Surrounding area
 Fuji River

See also
 List of railway stations in Japan

External links

  Minobu Line station information 

Railway stations in Japan opened in 1933
Railway stations in Yamanashi Prefecture
Minobu Line
Minobu, Yamanashi